Greece has a long presence at the Olympic Games, as they have competed at every Summer Olympic Games, one of only five countries to have done so, and most of the Winter Olympic Games. 
Greece has hosted the Games twice, both in Athens. As the home of the Ancient Olympic Games it was a natural choice as host nation for the revival of the modern Olympic Games in 1896, while Greece has also hosted the 2004 Summer Olympics. During the parade of nations at the opening ceremony of the Olympic Games, Greece always enters the stadium first and leads the parade to honor its status as the birthplace of the Olympics, with the notable exception of 2004 when Greece entered last as the host nation. Before the Games the Olympic Flame is lit in Olympia, the site of the Ancient Olympic Games, in a ceremony that reflects ancient Greek rituals and initiates the Olympic torch relay. The flag of Greece is always hoisted in the closing ceremony, along with the flags of the current and the next host country.
 
Greek athletes have won a total of 121 medals in 15 different sports and the country currently ranks 36rd in the all-time Summer Olympics medal count. Athletics and weightlifting have been the top medal-producing sports for the nation and in the latter Greece is placed among the top 10 countries overall. Gymnastics, shooting and wrestling are the other sports that have produced ten or more medals for Greece. In the inaugural 1896 Olympics, Greece finished second in the gold medals count, but won the most medals in total, in their best Olympic performance. The Greeks finished third in the 1906 Intercalated Games with 8 gold, 14 silver and 13 bronze medals (35 in total), which were considered Olympic at the time but are not officially recognized by the IOC today.

Greece did not win any medals at the Winter Olympics.

Hosted Games 
Greece has hosted the Summer Olympic Games on two occasions, the inaugural modern Olympics in 1896 and again in 2004. Both were held in Athens, which along with Paris, Los Angeles, and Tokyo are the cities that have hosted the Olympic Games twice, with London being the only city to have hosted them three times. The Greek capital also hosted the 1906 Intercalated Games, which at the time were considered to be Olympic Games by the International Olympic Committee.

Medal tables 

*Purple border colour indicates tournament was held on home soil.

Medals by Summer Games

Medals by Winter Games

Medals by summer sport

Medal tables by athlete

List of medalists

Athletes with most medals

The table below lists the athletes that have won more than one Olympic medal while competing for Greece. It does not include medals won for other nations and mixed teams. The athletes are shown in order by the number of total medals won; in case of the same number of total medals they are sorted by gold, silver and then bronze medals.

Top medalists
The tables below list the top Olympic medalists for Greece, sorted by gold, silver and then bronze medals.

Men

Women

Additional disputed medals of 1896 
There is confusion about certain results and medals in the first Summer Olympics of 1896. The Hellenic Olympic Committee, claiming different sources, cites in its website some different results for certain events and some additional medals for Greece, which are contradictory to those appearing in the IOC website. They are cited here separately and are not included in any of the other tables.

Summary by sport

Aquatics

Swimming

Greece first competed in swimming at the inaugural 1896 Games, sweeping the top three spots in one event open only to Greek sailors and winning two silver and one bronze medal in international events. Greek swimmers have won only one silver medal since then at the 2016 Games.

Diving 
Greece won a gold medal in Diving at the 2004 Games.

Water Polo 
Greece has won silver medals at the 2004 Games (women's) and 2020 Games (men's).

Athletics
Greece first competed in athletics at the first Games in 1896, winning the men's marathon. Since then, Greece have won numerous medals in athletics especially from the 1992 Games through to the 2020 Games, in what is Greece's most successful sport at the Olympic Games.

Cycling

Greece competed in all six of the cycling events at the first Games in 1896, winning one event and taking three second-place finishes. As of 2020, those were still the only cycling medals earned by Greek competitors.

Fencing

Greece competed in all three fencing events at the inaugural 1896 Games, winning two (the men's master's foil and the men's sabre) and adding a second-place finish in the men's sabre and third-place in the men's foil. However another bronze medal is considered nowadays in the same event. Those remain the only fencing medals Greece has won to date (through the 2020 Olympics).

Gymnastics

Greece sent 52 gymnasts to the first Games in 1896 (when team events featured very large teams), winning six medals including two of each color. Since then, Greece have won many medals in Gymnastics from the 1996 Games through to the 2020 Games.

Judo

Greece first competed in judo at the 2004 Games and has won two medals since, both won by the same judoka, Ilias Iliadis.

Rowing 
Greece first won a rowing medal at the 2004 Games and has won more medals since then.

Sailing 
Greece first competed in the sailing events in 1948 and won its first medal at the 1960 Games and has won numerous medals since then.

Shooting 

Greece competed in all five shooting events at the inaugural 1896 Games, winning three and medaling in the other two (earning a total of 9 medals) and has won shooting medals again from the 2016 Games onwards.

Tae Kwon Do

Greece first competed in tae kwon do at the 2000 Games and had a notable success during the 2000s decade, winning medals in 3 consecutive Olympic Games.

Tennis

Greece first competed in tennis at the inaugural 1896 Games, with seven players competing in men's singles and doubles. Greek players won the silver and bronze medals in the singles; a pair of Greek players combined to win the silver in the doubles, nowadays considered a Greek team and therefore a Greek medal. The 1896 medals remain (through the 2020 Games) the only tennis medals won by Greek players.

Weightlifting

Greece first competed in weightlifting at the inaugural 1896 Games, with three lifters competing. Greek lifters won the bronze medals in both events. Since then, Greek lifters won numerous medals from the 1992 Games through to the 2004 Games, including from Greece's top Olympic medalist Pyrros Dimas.

Wrestling

Greece first competed in wrestling at the inaugural 1896 Games, with two wrestlers competing in the open weight class event and taking the silver and bronze medals. Since then, Greek wrestlers have won medals from the 1968 Games onwards.

Hosted Olympic logos and mottos

1896 Summer Olympics

In 1896 the first modern Olympic Games were hosted in Athens, the capital of Greece. The Games were a revival  of the ancient Games held every four years in Olympia, in which participants from all Greek city-states were taking part, during antiquity.

By tradition, Greece is since then the first country to enter the stadium, during opening ceremonies.

2004 Summer Olympics

The 2004 Summer Olympics witnessed  the returning of the Olympic Games to Greece, where they were born. They were held, for the second time, in Athens, while a few events were hosted in a small number of other cities including Thessaloniki, Patras, Volos and Heraklion.

The Games' motto was Welcome Home (Καλώς ήρθατε σπίτι). The 2004 logo consisted of an olive tree branch (κότινος), with the colors of the modern Greek flag. The olive tree was a symbol of the city of Athens, while "kotinos" represented the Olympic spirit, as it was the only reward that the athletes were receiving in Olympia, during the ancient Games. The logo was revealed in 1999.

See also
 List of flag bearers for Greece at the Olympics
 :Category:Olympic competitors for Greece
 Greece at the Paralympics

Notes 
One gold medal of Greece listed in the IOC website for the 1924 Paris summer Olympics is not about a sport but for an artistic competition (sculpture) won by Konstantinos Dimitriadis.

References

External links